Enrico P. Mancini (April 16, 1933 – May 26, 2006) was an American film and television actor. He played Mayor Cobb in the 1985 film Friday the 13th: A New Beginning. He also played Sal in the 1974 film The Gambler and Steve in the 1984 television film A Streetcar Named Desire.

Career 
Mancini started his acting career playing Marco in a 1964 production of the play A View from the Bridge. Mancini continued to appear on stage and in television commercials, before starting to appear in films and on television in the 1970s, first appearing in McCloud.

Mancini later appeared in films and television programs including The Rockford Files, M*A*S*H, Deep Cover, Charlie's Angels, Ed Wood, Across 110th Street, Laverne & Shirley, Who's the Boss?, Ghostbusters, Quantum Leap, Nickelodeon and The A-Team.

Mancini died in May 2006 in Woodland Hills, California, at the age of 73.

Filmography

Film

Television

References

External links 

Rotten Tomatoes profile
Ric Mancini – Friday the 13th: The Website

1933 births
2006 deaths
Male actors from New York (state)
American male television actors
American male film actors
20th-century American male actors
21st-century American male actors